The London Borough of Barking and Dagenham, one of the outer London boroughs, has over 25 parks, gardens and open spaces within its boundaries. These provide the "green lungs" for leisure activities.

Principal open spaces
Apart from smaller green areas such as sports grounds and smaller gardens, the following are the major open spaces in the Borough:

Barking
 Barking Park
 Greatfields Park
 Newlands Park
 Essex Road Gardens
 Central Area Open Space
 Quaker Gardens
 Barking Abbey Ruins
 Barking Town Quay Open Space
 St. Margaret's Churchyard

Dagenham

 Beam Central Park (also partly in Havering)
 Beam Parklands
 Central Park
 Valence Park and Valence House Grounds
 Parsloes Park
 Mayesbrook Park
 Pondfield Park
 Old Dagenham Park
 Castle Green
 Goresbrook Park
 Eastbrookend Country Park
 King George's Field
 The Leys

Chadwell Heath
 St. Chads Park
 Marks Gate Open Space (Also known as Tantony Green)

Marks Gate
 Marks Gate Open Space (Also known as Tantony Green)
 Kingston Hill Avenue Recreation Ground

Mayesbrook Park, in the borough is one of 11 parks throughout Greater London chosen to receive money for redevelopment by a public vote in 2009. The park received £400,000 towards better footpaths, more lighting, refurbished public toilets and new play areas for children.

Water
The River Thames forms the southern edge of the borough. In many places there is a Thames Path, following the river, however views are problematic due to the high flood defences and industrial premises on the waterfront.

The River Roding forms the western boundary with the London Borough of Newham. This is accessible around the Town Quay area, Barking's former port.

Local nature reserves
Local nature reserves in the borough are: Beam Valley Country Park, Dagenham Village Churchyard, Eastbrookend Country Park, Mayesbrook Park South, Parsloes Park Squatts, Ripple Nature Reserve, Scrattons Eco Park and The Chase Nature Reserve.

References

The Boroughs parks and open spaces LB Barking and Dagenham, Local studies info sheet #6

External links
LB B&D Parks dept.